CYPC may refer to:

Paulatuk (Nora Aliqatchialuk Ruben) Airport
China Yangtze Power